The 2020 Louisiana Ragin' Cajuns baseball team represented the University of Louisiana at Lafayette in the 2020 NCAA Division I baseball season. The Ragin' Cajuns played their home games at M. L. Tigue Moore Field at Russo Park and were led by first year head coach Matt Deggs.

This season was also their first with new head coach Matt Deggs. This came after Head Coach Tony Robichaux’s death on July 3, 2019 after suffering from a massive heart attack. Deggs had previously served as Assistant under Robichaux from 2012 to 2014. He had also served as head coach at Sam Houston State from 2015 to 2019 and Texarkana College from 1998 to 2002 and stints as assistant at Northwestern State, Arkansas, and Texas A&M.

On March 12, the Sun Belt Conference announced the indefinite suspension of all spring athletics, including baseball, due to the increasing risk of the COVID-19 pandemic. On March 13, Louisiana governor John Bel Edwards signed an executive order banning gatherings of over 250 people until as early as April 18, thus ending all possible future 2020 home or in-state games until that time if the season were to continue. Soon after, the Sun Belt cancelled all season and postseason play.

Preseason

Signing Day Recruits

Sun Belt Conference Coaches Poll
The Sun Belt Conference Coaches Poll will be released sometime around January 30, 2020 and the Cajuns were picked to finish second in the West Division and second overall in the conference.

Preseason All-Sun Belt Team & Honors
Drake Nightengale (USA, Sr, Pitcher)
Zach McCambley (CCU, Jr, Pitcher)
Levi Thomas (TROY, Jr, Pitcher)
Andrew Papp (APP, Sr, Pitcher)
Jack Jumper (ARST, Sr, Pitcher)
Kale Emshoff (LR, RS-Jr, Catcher)
Kaleb DeLatorre (USA, Sr, First Base)
Luke Drumheller (APP, So, Second Base)
Hayden Cantrelle (LA, Jr, Shortstop)
Garrett Scott (LR, RS-Sr, Third Base)
Mason McWhorter (GASO, Sr, Outfielder)
Ethan Wilson (USA, So, Outfielder)
Rigsby Mosley (TROY, Jr, Outfielder)
Will Hollis (TXST, Sr, Designated Hitter)
Andrew Beesley (ULM, Sr, Utility)

Roster

Coaching staff

Schedule and results

Schedule Source:
*Rankings are based on the team's current ranking in the D1Baseball poll.

References

Louisiana
Louisiana Ragin' Cajuns baseball seasons
Louisiana Ragin' Cajuns baseball